Wahyu Sukarta (born 12 June 1994) is an Indonesian professional footballer who plays as a defensive midfielder for Liga 1 club PSS Sleman.

Career statistics

Club

Honours

Club
PSS Sleman
 Liga 2: 2018
Menpora Cup third place: 2021

References

External links
 Wahyu Sukarta at Soccerway
 Wahyu Sukarta at Liga Indonesia

1994 births
Living people
Indonesian footballers
Liga 2 (Indonesia) players
Liga 1 (Indonesia) players
PSS Sleman players
Association football midfielders
People from Sleman Regency
Sportspeople from Special Region of Yogyakarta